Holingol (a.k.a. Huolin Gol;) is a county-level city of Inner Mongolia, China.

It has a population of more than 70,000, which includes 17 ethnic groups. It is the northernmost and westernmost county-level division of Tongliao.

Transport
China National Highway 304
Inner Mongolia Provincial Highway 101
Tonghuo Railway
Holingol Huolinhe Airport

Economy
GDP: RMB ￥1.82 billion in 2004, RMB ￥5 billion in 2006, RMB ￥13.1 billion in 2008
Pillar industries: stockbreeding, mining, tourism
Composition of GDP in 2008: ￥0.16 billion in primary industry, ￥9.35 billion in secondary industry, ￥3.59 billion in third industry.

Education
At year-end of 2006, there are 15 primary and secondary schools and 5 kindergartens  in the city.
Number of students enrolled at year-end of 2006: 896 in kindergartens, 10637 in primary schools, 3049 in junior high schools, 2112 in senior high schools.
Number of teachers at year-end of 2006: 1177 full-time teachers
Percentage of children of the right age attending primary school in 2006: 100%
Percentage of primary school graduates entering a higher school in 2006: 100%
Percentage of junior high graduates entering a higher school in 2006: 95.24%

Health
Number of medical entities at year-end of 2006: 4
Number of health-care entities at year-end of 2006: 2
Number of hospital beds at year-end of 2006: 238
Number of medical doctors, registered nurses and medical technicians at year end of 2006: 420

References

External links
Official site of Holingol
Official site of Tongliao

County-level divisions of Inner Mongolia
Tongliao